The 1976 Soviet Cup was an association football cup competition of the Soviet Union. The winner of the competition, Dinamo Tbilisi qualified for the continental tournament.

Competition schedule

First round
 [Mar 21] 
 AMUR Blagoveshchensk       1-0  Kuzbass Kemerovo 
   [N.Ostrovskiy. Att: 10,000] 
 Daugava Riga               0-1  SKA Rostov-na-Donu       [in Sochi] 
   [Alexandr Rasputin 18 pen. Att: 2,000] 
 KAYRAT Alma-Ata            1-0  Spartak Orjonikidze      [in Chimkent] 
   [Sergei Rozhkov 12] 
 Krivbass Krivoi Rog        0-1  METALLURG Zaporozhye     [in Yalta] 
   [Yuriy Petrov 56. Att: 2,000] 
 NEFTCHI Baku               2-1  Kolhozchi Ashkhabad      [aet] 
   [Nikolai Smolnikov, Bayram Durdyyev (K) og - Nuretdin Aliyev. Att: 10,000] 
 NISTRU Kishinev            2-1  Rubin Kazan 
   [Igor Nadein pen, Yevgeniy Piunovskiy pen – Murat Zadikashvili. Att: 14,000] 
 PAHTAKOR Tashkent          4-0  Dinamo Makhachkala 
   [Tulyagan Isakov, Viktor Churkin, Yevgeniy Zhukov, Boris Serostanov. Att: 20,000] 
 Pamir Dushanbe             1-2  TORPEDO Kutaisi 
   [Valeriy Tursunov – Levan Nodia, Vladimir Shelia. Att: 13,000] 
 SPARTAK Ivano-Frankovsk    2-0  Kuban Krasnodar 
   [Viktor Kozin 73, Mikhail Palamarchuk 78. Att: 6,000] 
 TAVRIA Simferopol          3-0  Spartak Nalchik 
   [Valentin Prilepskiy 30, Nikolai Klimov 56, Nikolai Pinchuk 66. Att: 12,000] 
 Terek Grozny               1-1  YANGIYER     [pen 4-5]   [in Mukachevo] 
   [Anatoliy Mikheyev – I.Budantsev. Att: 1,000] 
 Uralets Nizhniy Tagil      1-2  SHINNIK Yaroslavl        [in Chkalovsk] 
   [V.Zamotayev – Nikolai Smirnov pen, Viktor Sanin. Att: 1,000] 
 ZVEZDA Perm                3-1  Žalgiris Vilnius 
   [Vladimir Aleksandrov 20, Vladimir Solovyov 52 pen, Anatoliy Komkov ? – Kestutis Latoza 30 pen. Att: 12,000]

Second round
 [Mar 27] 
 DINAMO Moskva              1-0  Kayrat Alma-Ata          [in Nikolayev] 
   [Andrei Yakubik 39. Att: 12,000] 
 DNEPR Dnepropetrovsk       2-0  Zvezda Perm              [in Simferopol] 
   [Sergei Malko 13, Pyotr Yakovlev 78. Att: 2,500] 
 KARPATY Lvov               1-0  Pahtakor Tashkent 
   [Vladimir Dolbonosov (P) 74 og. Att: 10,000] 
 Metallurg Zaporozhye       1-1  DINAMO Tbilisi           [pen 4-5] 
   [Gennadiy Degtyaryov 65 – David Kipiani 56 pen. Att: 25,000] 
 Nistru Kishinev            0-1  TORPEDO Moskva 
   [Anatoliy Degtyaryov 40. Att: 18,000] 
 Shinnik Yaroslavl          0-2  LOKOMOTIV Moskva         [in Andizhan] 
   [Alexandr Kozlovskikh 2, Alexei Ovchinnikov 89 pen. Att: 1,000] 
 SKA Rostov-na-Donu         0-1  ARARAT Yerevan 
   [Khoren Oganesyan 79. Att: 10,000] 
 Spartak Moskva             3-4  TAVRIA Simferopol        [aet]      [in Sochi] 
   [Valeriy Gladilin 21, 54, 75 pen – Vladimir Grigoryev 20, Yevgeniy Korol 73, 98, Valentin Prilepskiy 76. Att: 5,000] 
 Torpedo Kutaisi            0-1  CSKA Moskva 
   [Alexandr Kolpovskiy 12. Att: 35,000] 
 Yangiyer                   0-1  CHERNOMORETS Odessa 
   [Alexandr Pogorelov 60. Att: 10,000] 
 ZENIT Leningrad            1-1  Spartak Ivano-Frankovsk  [pen 3-2]  [in Sochi] 
   [Georgiy Khromchenkov 15 – Stepan Chopei 1. Att: 5,000] 
 [Mar 28] 
 KRYLYA SOVETOV Kuibyshev   3-1  Dinamo Minsk             [in Sochi] 
   [Nikolai Pavlov 43, Viktor Filippov 58, Valeryan Panfilov 74 – Alexandr Prokopenko 48 pen. Att: 2,000] 
 ZARYA Voroshilovgrad       2-1  Amur Blagoveshchensk 
   [Nikolai Pinchuk 51, Vyacheslav Semyonov 66 – R.Mkrtychev 17] 
 [Mar 29] 
 SHAKHTYOR Donetsk          1-0  Neftchi Baku     [aet]   [in Zhdanov] 
   [Vitaliy Starukhin 110. Att: 6,000]

Third round
 [May 5] 
 DINAMO Tbilisi             3-0  Zenit Leningrad 
   [Vakhtang Koridze 48, Alexandr Chivadze 49, David Kipiani 74. Att: 9,000] 
 KARPATY Lvov               1-0  Krylya Sovetov Kuibyshev 
   [Yaroslav Kikot 27. Att: 22,000] 
 Lokomotiv Moskva           0-1  ARARAT Yerevan           [aet] 
   [Nikolai Kazaryan 102. Att: 10,000] 
 Zarya Voroshilovgrad       0-1  SHAKHTYOR Donetsk        [aet] 
   [Vyacheslav Golovin 93. Att: 15,000] 
 [May 6] 
 Tavria Simferopol          0-1  DNEPR Dnepropetrovsk 
   [Viktor Romanyuk 90. Att: 25,000] 
 [May 12] 
 CSKA Moskva                2-1  Torpedo Moskva 
   [Yuriy Saukh 76, Boris Kopeikin 90 - Vladimir Buturlakin 25. Att: 18,000] 
 [May 27] 
 Chernomorets Odessa        2-3  DINAMO Moskva            [aet] 
   [Vladimir Makarov 31, 118 pen – Andrei Yakubik 90, 108 pen, Alexandr Makhovikov 91. Att: 25,000]

Quarterfinals
 [Jun 4] 
 DNEPR Dnepropetrovsk    2-1  Dinamo Kiev 
   [Pyotr Yakovlev 24, 80 – Viktor Zvyagintsev 34. Att: 30,000] 
 [Jun 12] 
 DINAMO Tbilisi          2-1  Karpaty Lvov 
   [David Kipiani 43, Vakhtang Koridze 52 pen – Vladimir Danilyuk 17. Att: 35,000] 
 [Jul 3] 
 ARARAT Yerevan          2-1  CSKA Moskva 
   [Nikolai Kazaryan 27, Nazar Petrosyan 47 – Sergei Morozov 79. Att: 27,000] 
 Dinamo Moskva           0-0  SHAKHTYOR Donetsk     [pen 2-3] 
   [Att: 25,000]

Semifinals
 [Aug 30] 
 ARARAT Yerevan          2-1  Dnepr Dnepropetrovsk 
   [Khoren Oganesyan 14, Arutyun Minasyan 19 – Sergei Malko 81. Att: 17,000] 
 Shakhtyor Donetsk       0-2  DINAMO Tbilisi 
   [David Kipiani 13, Vladimir Gutsayev 73. Att: 40,000]

Final

External links
 Complete calendar. helmsoccer.narod.ru
 1976 Soviet Cup. Footballfacts.ru
 1976 Soviet football season. RSSSF

Soviet Cup seasons
Cup
Soviet Cup
Soviet Cup